Subodh Bhave (born 9 November 1975) is an Indian actor, writer, producer and director who is known for his work in Marathi Cinema. He has acted in many commercially successful and critically acclaimed Marathi movies. He is best known for his work in Ani... Dr. Kashinath Ghanekar, Balgandharva, Katyar Kaljat Ghusali. He recently portrayed Vikrant Saranjame aka Gajendra Patil in Zee Marathi's Tula Pahate Re.

Early life and family 
Subodh was born in Pune and now lives in Mumbai. He completed his graduation from Symbiosis College of Arts and Commerce - Pune and completed M.Com. He started his career as a salesman in a small IT company called Inika Technologies, situated in Koregaon Park (Pune) and moved to acting later. He married his childhood friend Manjiri Bhave in 2001, and they have 2 Sons, Kanha and Malhar.

Career

Subodh has acted in numerous Marathi TV serials, movies and theatre. He has been applauded by many noted professionals. His noted roles include the role of Bal Gangadhar Tilak in the movie Lokmanya: Ek Yugpurush, a biopic on one of the country's biggest social reformers. His role of Balgandharva was also appreciated in the film Balgandharva, which was based on the artist Narayanrao Rajhans and the book named Gandharva Gatha.

Bhave directed the play Katyar Kaljat Ghusali, in which he also essayed a supporting role Sadashiv. In 2015, Bhave directed a Katyar Kaljat Ghusali based on this play, in which he played one of the main roles, that of Sadashiv. It was one of the highest-grossing Marathi films of 2015.

Zee Marathi's  TV Show "Tula Pahate Re" starring Subodh Bhave, Gayatri Datar and Abhidnya Bhave has brought in huge success to the show. A very unique story-line and brilliant acting skills of Subodh Bhave have glued its audience leaving other TV Shows behind in terms of TRP Ratings.

Filmography

Television

Theatre

Awards and nominations

References

External links
 Subodh Bhave on IMDb

Living people
Male actors from Pune
Male actors in Marathi cinema
1976 births
Male actors in Hindi cinema
Male actors in Marathi television
21st-century Indian male actors